Kildal is a surname. Notable people with the surname include:

Arne Kildal (1885–1972), Norwegian author, librarian and civil servant
Birger Kildal (1849–1913), Norwegian attorney and businessman
Karl Kildal (1881–1932), Norwegian equestrian
Peter Kildal (born 1975), Norwegian bobsledder
Peter Daniel B. W. Kildal (1816–1881), Norwegian politician
Peter Wessel Wind Kildal (1814–1882), Norwegian merchant and industrialist